Nyantakyi Kusi Emmanuel, stage name Kojo Manuel (born 4 December) is a Ghanaian Radio Host, Event MC, Artiste. He was crowned as the Best Event Hypeman at the Ghana Entertainment Awards USA, 2022, he also won the Best MC/Hypeman at the Ghana Event Awards 2021 & Best MC & Hypeman at Ghana DJ Awards 2019. He currently works with YFM Ghana, Ghana's biggest urban music station, where he hosts the late afternoon show, The DrYve of Your LYfe, from Monday to Friday, 3 pm till 7 pm.

He won the Best Hypeman at the Y Clash of the DJs in April 2022.

Early life and career 
He was a general arts student at the Opoku Ware Secondary School in Kumasi and continued to the University of Ghana, studying diploma in archives administration and later a bachelor's degree in information studies.

He worked with Echo House as a digital marketer and copywriter from 2014 to 2018 and started as an MC for his university hall, Jean Nelson Aka Hall in the University Ghana in 2014.

Notable performances 

 iMullar Sound System
 MMC Live
 Rumble 5 (Close Up Launch)
 GTCO Music Concert 2021
 Tribvl Jungle Party 2019, 2021
 Bud X GH (Budweiser Ghana Launch)
 Coke Zero Launch
 Sony Music & Friends
 GHana Gas End of Year Party
 Junk Fest Accra
 Gold Block Party Accra
 Freedom Wave Concert
 Spotify Private Party, Accra
 Vodafone TurnUp Concert 2020
 Sunset With Martell 
 Amapiano And Brunch 2021 till Date (Monthly Event)
 TINAFest 2019
Vodafone X Concert 2019, Kumasi 
Ghana Meets Naija 2019
Tidal Rave Festival 2019
Orijinal Beats (over 12 different locations in Ghana)
BF Suma Concert 2018
MTN Pulse Invasion Concerts 2018 - Takoradi/Cape Coast/Kumasi
Orijinal Beats - Kumasi, Accra, Tema
Shatta Wale's Reign Concert 2018
La Meme Gang's Crusade 2 & 3 (2017 & 2018)
Manifestivities 2018, 2019, 2020
Ghana Rocks 2018
DJ Slim Invasion Concert 2018
Kuami Eugene's Rockstar Concert 2018
YFM @ 10 Area Codes Jam
AFRIMA Music Village Concert 
Vac With DJ Vyrusky 
4syte TV Artiste Night - Pent Hall Week
Island Rave 2018
Shatta Wale's After the Storm Concert 2016
Mr Eazi's Life is Eazi Campus Tour 2016
 Vodafone X Concerts 2015 - 2016
 Freshafair Concerts 2015, 2016, 2017, 2018
 EL's BAR Concerts 2015 - 2016
 Tidal Rave 2015, 2016, 2017, 2018
 Kojo Cue's Cue For President Concert
 Cina Soul's Metanoia Concert 2016
 Shandy Wave Experience
 Unprecedented All Black Affair (UABA)
 Epilogo 2015, 2016, 2017, 2018
 Hidden City House Party
 Detty Rave 2017, 2018 
 Afrochella 2017, 2018, 2019, 2021 
 Rapperholic 2017, 2018, 2019

Awards and nominations

Endorsements 
Kojo Manuel got an endorsement deal with Guinness Ghana Breweries Ltd for their new product, Orijin in 2018 as the host of Original Beats on-air on Y 107.9 fm and on the ground events, which covered about 20 events into 2019.

Interviews 
Since taking over as the official host of The DrYve on Y 107.9fm since May 2020, Kojo Manuel has interviewed a lot of high profile artistes including:

 Focalistic
 DBN Gogo
 Musa Keys
 BNXN
 Kofi Jamar 
 Adina
 Kuami Eugene
 KelvynBoy
 Tiwa Savage
 Kofi Kinaata
 NSG
 Davido
 G4Boys
 6lack
 Rema
 Oxlade
Victoria Kimani
 Gramps Morgan
 Kiddominant
 Wurld
 Kidi
 Cina Soul
 DopeNation
 Mz Vee
 Mr Drew
 Bosom P-Yung 
 Strongman

On the Y Disco Diaries segment on The DrYve where Ghanaian music legends are celebrated, he has interviewed personalities like:

 Rocky Dawuni
 Nana King
 Aka Blay
 Bessa Simons etc.

Additionally, as host of the Saturday night show, Party Pressure on Y 107.9fm, he interviewed other artistes like:

 EL
 Shaker
 Kofi Mole
 Quamina MP etc.

Discography 

 Detty Yourself
 The Royal MashUp
Akpa Show featuring Kojo Cue & Shaker 
Concern featuring Article Wan & Lipstick 
Time featuring Quamina MP, Shaker & Ginja 
Waiting featuring Kelvyn Boy & Nektunez

References 

Year of birth missing (living people)
Living people
Ghanaian television presenters
Masters of ceremonies
University of Ghana alumni